Advanced Micro Devices (AMD) had a number of product lines with the part numbers beginning with "29". These families were generally not related to one another.

The Am29(F, BL, DL, DS)xxx family contains a variety of flash memories, and is not part of the Am2900/Am29000 families.

Am2900 Family

The first such family is the Am2900 series of integrated circuits (ICs) created in 1975 designed in bit-slice topology so they could be used as modular components each representing a different aspect of a computer control unit (CCU). For details on the Am2900 Family see The Am2900 Family Data Book, by AMD.

Am29xxx Family

The AMD Am29xxx series of chips are high performance processors and system building-block devices.

Am29000
The Am29000 family are 32-bit RISC microprocessors.  The Am29000 was a Berkeley RISC, register window design similar to the Sun SPARC.
 Am29000 32-bit RISC microprocessor, 4-stage Pipeline, 512-byte BTC (branch target cache)
 Am29005 32-bit RISC microprocessor with neither (functional) MMU nor BTC
 Am29027 Floating-point unit co-processor chip
 Am29030 32-bit RISC microprocessor with a 8K byte instruction cache
 Am29035 32-bit RISC microprocessor with a 4K byte instruction cache
 Am29040 32-bit RISC microprocessor with a 8K byte instruction cache, 4 KB data cache and hardware multiply
 Am29041 Data transfer controller
 Am29050 32-bit RISC microprocessor with FPU, 1kB BTC
 Am29062 Integrated cache unit with 8K bytes RAM

Am29100 Family
The Am29100 family are microcontrollers and their support chips. Most of the microcontrollers are 'intelligent', performing operations that would normally be performed by software.
 Am29101 16-bit Microprocessor Slice Circuit with Speed Select
 Am29111 Microprogram Sequencer Controller - For microprogram memory
 Am29112 High-performance 8-bit slice Microprogram Sequencer
 Am29114 Real-time 8-bit priority interrupt controller
 Am29116 High-performance 16-bit microprocessor
 Am29117 High-performance 16-bit microprocessor
 Am29118 8-bit I/O support unit for Am29116
 Am29130 16 to 30-bit shift register
 Am29141 Fuse programmable controller

Am29200 Family
The Am29200 family are processors intended for the high-end microcontroller market.
 Am29200 32-bit Microcontroller, internal ROM, DRAM interface, PIA/PIO/serial/Parallel/JTAG Ports
 Am29202 32-bit Microcontroller, internal ROM, DRAM interface, PIA/PIO/Serial/Parallel/JTAG Ports
 Am29205 32-bit Microcontroller, internal ROM, DRAM interface, PIA/PIO/Serial/Parallel Ports
 Am29240 32-bit Microcontroller, hardware multiply, internal ROM, DRAM interface, PIA/PIO/Serial/Parallel/JTAG ports
 Am29243 32-bit Microcontroller, hardware multiply, internal ROM, DRAM interface, PIA/PIO/Serial/Parallel/JTAG Ports
 Am29245 32-bit Microcontroller, internal ROM, DRAM interface, PIA/PIO/Serial/Parallel/JTAG Ports

Am29300 Family
The Am29300 family are 32-bit bit-slice devices.
 Am29323 32-bit Parallel Multiplier
 Am29325 32-bit Floating-point unit
 Am29327 32-bit FPU
 Am29331 16-bit Microprogram Sequencer
 Am29332 64bit in, 32-bit out, ALU
 Am29334 Four-Port, Dual-Access Register File (SRAM)
 Am29337 16-bit Bounds Checker
 Am29338 32-bit Byte Queue,4 FIFOs
 Am29360 32-bit Error Detection and Correction Unit
 Am29368 1M-bit Dynamic Memory Controller (DMC)

Am29400 Family
The Am29040 family are ECL bit-slice components
 Am29433 32 x 32 Bit Floating-Point Multiplier, ECL-10K Logic
 Am29434 Register File, SRAM - Dual Port access, ECL-10K Logic

Am29500 Family
The Am29500 family are devices intended to build DSP-like functions.
 Am29501 Multi-Port Pipelined Processor for DSP
 Am29509 hardware multiplier 12x12
 Am29510 hardware multiplier 16x16, 32-bit answers through 16-bit output Pictures: AMD_AM29510DC.jpg
 Am29516 hardware multiplier 16x16, 32-bit answers through 16-bit output Pictures: AMD_AM29516DC.jpg
 Am29517 hardware multiplier 16x16, 32-bit answers through 16-bit output Pictures: AMD_AM29517DC.jpg AMD_AM29L517DC.jpg
 Am29520 Multilevel Pipe-Line Register
 Am29521 Multilevel Pipe-Line Register
 Am29524 Pipeline Register - Dual 7-Deep or Single 14-Deep
 Am29525 Pipeline Register - Dual 8-Deep or Single 16-Deep Pictures: AMD_AM29525DC.jpg
 Am29526 Sin/Cos generators via fast look up tables
 Am29527 Sin/Cos generators via fast look up tables
 Am29528 Sin/Cos generators via fast lookup tables
 Am29529 Sin/Cos generators via fast lookup tables
 Am29540 Sequence to produce addresses for FFT Computations

Am29600 Family
The Am29600 family are dynamic memory support devices.
 Am29660 CRC-Polynomial Error Circuit - Cascadable 64-bits of data, Pictures: Ic-photo-amd-AM29C660DJC.png
 Am29668 Dynamic Memory Controller - CDMC for 80386 interface
 Am29676 Memory Driver - 11-Bit DRAM Driver
 Am29688 Dynamic Memory Controller - CDMC for 80386 interface

Am29700 Family
The Am29700 family are fast memory devices.
 Am29700/701 Non-Inverting Schottky 64-Bit Random Access Memory (RAM)
 Am29702/703 Schottky 64-Bit RAM
 Am29705 16-Word by 4-Bit 2-Port RAM
 Am29707 Multi-Port SRAM
 Am29720/721 Low-Power Schottky 256-Bit RAM
 Am29750/Am29752 32-Word by 8-Bit Programmable Read-Only Memory (PROM)
 Am29754/Am29755 256-Word by 4-Bit PROM
 Am29770/Am29771 2048-Bit Generic Series Bipolar PROM
 Am29774/Am29775 4096-Bit Generic Series Bipolar PROM

Am29800 Family
The Am29800 family are bus interface chips and bit-slice support devices notable for in-circuit testing capability.
 Am29803 I/O Controller, 16-Way Branch Unit
 Am29806 6 bit Comparator/Decoder
 Am29809 9 bit Comparator
 Am29811 Next Address Control Unit
 Am29818 Pipeline register/diagnostic register
 Am29821 10-bit D flip-flop with Tri-State output
 Am29822 10-Bit D-Type Flip-Flop
 Am29823 9-Bit D-Type Flip-Flop with Tri-State output
 Am29824 9-Bit D-Type Flip-Flop with Tri-State output
 Am29825 8-Bit D Flip-Flop
 Am29826 8-BIT BUS INTERFACE FLIP-FLOPS WITH Tri-State OUTPUTS
 Am29827 10-Bit Buffers/Line Drivers
 Am29828 10-Bit Inverting Line Drivers
 Am29833 CMOS 9 bit PARITY BUS TRANSCEIVER
 Am29834 8-BIT TO 9-BIT PARITY BUS TRANSCEIVER
 Am29841 10-BIT Bus Interface Latches
 Am29842 10-BIT Bus Interface Latches
 Am29843 9-BIT Bus Interface Latches
 Am29844 9-Bit D-Type Latch
 Am29845 8-Bit Transparent Latch WITH Tri-State OUTPUTS
 Am29846 8-Bit BUS INTERFACE D-TYPE LATCHES, inverted outputs
 Am29853/Am29855 9-bit asynchronous parity transceiver
 Am29854 -BIT TO 9-BIT Bus Transceiver With Parity Generator/Checker; Parity-Error Flag With Open-Collector Output
 Am29861 10-BIT Bus Interface Transceiver
 Am29862 8-Bit Bus transceivers, Tri-State
 Am29863 9-BIT Bus transceivers, Tri-State, aka 74F863
 Am29864 9-BIT BUS TRANSCEIVER (Inverting)

Am29900 Family
The Am29900 family are bus interface chips.
 Am29921 10-Bit D-Type Flip-Flop
 Am29923 9-Bit D-Type Flip-Flop
 Am29925 Octal D-Type Latch - 3-AND Out EN
 Am29927 Non-Inverting-Function Buffer Gate
 Am29928 Inverting-Function Buffer Gate
 Am29933 Bus Transceiver - +9-bit parity tree
 Am29941 10-Bit D-Type Latch
 Am29943 9-Bit D-Type Latch
 Am29945 Octal D-Type Latch
 Am29953/Am29955 Bus Transceiver - +9-bit parity tree
 Am29961 Bus Transceiver - 10-bit, no buffer
 Am29963 Bus Transceiver - 9-bit, no buffer
 Am29982 Bus Controller - 4x4-port multiple bus exchange
 Am29983/Am19985 Bus Controller - 9x4-port multiple bus exchange

See also
 AMD
 AMD Am2900
 AMD Am29000
 Bit-slice

References
 The Am2900 Family Data Book, by AMD
 32-bit Microprogrammable Products Am29c300/29300, by AMD
 Am29PL100 Field Programmable Controllers, by AMD
 http://www.cpushack.net/Am29k.html
 https://web.archive.org/web/20060302090939/http://mevaldez.home.mchsi.com/BitSlice.pdf
 AMD Bipolar Microprocessor Logic and interface Am2900 Family 1983 Data Book

Am 2900 and Am 29000 families
AMD Am2900 and Am29000 families
Bit-slice chips